Hacker International was a Japanese video game company that developed and published games from 1990 to 2001 for the Nintendo Famicom (including Famicom Disk System), NEC PC Engine (including PC Engine CD), Sony PlayStation (as Map Japan) consoles, and Microsoft Windows PCs. The company was known for its play-for-porn approach to gaming, with such games as AV Pachi-Slot (Hot Slots) and Soap Panic (Magic Bubble) featuring female nudity as a reward for skilful playing. These games were usually distributed through mail order and sold approximately 30,000 to 50,000 copies each. Many of their games were developed by Taiwanese companies and were released in non-pornographic form elsewhere in the world; however three were released in the United States for the Nintendo Entertainment System with pornography intact (albeit sometimes modified to "Westernise" the girls' features) by another Taiwanese company, Panesian.

The Hacker name was first used by Satoru Hagiwara, an entrepreneur and former music producer, for a monthly PC magazine. Hacker International was founded by Hagiwara as an outlet for its writers' ideas; its first product was the Hacker Junior, an upgrade for Famicom systems that provided composite video output and turbo controllers, for which they were sued by Nintendo and eventually settled out of court. The company was also known for the Disk Hacker software which allowed users to copy Famicom Disk System disks using only an ordinary Disk System (as opposed to the official method of using Nintendo's authorised Disk Writer units, which were placed only in game stores and charged 500 yen to copy a selected game to a customer's disk). Several versions were released to combat successive anti-piracy measures introduced by Nintendo.

None of Hacker's games, with the exception of their 15 PlayStation titles, were licensed by the respective console manufacturers; Hiroshi Yamauchi personally opposed pornographic content in Famicom games, believing they would tarnish Nintendo's reputation. When Tokuma Shoten's Family Computer magazine published advertisements for Hacker's games, it felt its relationship with Nintendo—which it relied on for preview materials—was so threatened that five of Tokuma's top executives travelled to Nintendo to apologise to Yamauchi in person. However, NEC was more tolerant of Hacker's PC Engine releases (under the Games Express brand) and actually thanked Hacker for helping console sales. Hacker became a licensee for the PlayStation under the name Map Japan, releasing 15 games, but eventually closed in 2001 due to competition from other publishers and Hagiwara's own loss of interest in gaming.

Hacker's relationship to other Japanese adult console game producers of the era, such as Super Pig and MIMI Pro, is debated. For example, in the case of Super Pig, some claim this is merely a pseudonym under which Hacker published Disk System games while others maintain it is an entirely separate company that only occasionally worked with Hacker.

Games

Famicom ROM cartridge

Famicom Disk System
 Bodyconquest I (Credited on-screen to Indies Soft)
 Bishoujo SF Alien Battle

Super Pig games
 Sexy Invaders
 Bishoujo Sexy Derby
 Bishoujo Sexy Slot
 Moero Yakyuuken
 Gal's Dungeon: Yakyuuken Part II

PC-Engine HuCard
All games branded Games Express.
 1992 - Lady Sword
 1992 - Kyuukyoku Mahjong Idol Graphic
 1993 - Strip Fighter II
 1993 - Bodyconquest II
 1993 - Kyuukyoku Mahjong Idol Graphic II

PC-Engine CD
All games branded Games Express, require Games Express System Card.
 1994 - Hi-Leg Fantasy

See also
 American Video Entertainment
 Adult video game

References

 Gamefaqs.com

Video game development companies
Video game publishers
Defunct video game companies of Japan
Erotic video games